Granvin is a former municipality in the old Hordaland county, Norway. The municipality existed from 1838 until its dissolution in 2020 when it merged with Voss Municipality. The municipality was located in the traditional district of Hardanger. The administrative centre of Granvin was the village of Eide, which is also called "Granvin". About half of the residents of the municipality lived in the municipal centre. The rest lived in the rural valley areas surrounding the Granvin Fjord or the lake Granvinsvatnet in the central part of the municipality.

Prior to its dissolution in 2020, the  municipality is the 326th largest by area out of the 422 municipalities in Norway. Granvin is the 403rd most populous municipality in Norway with a population of 933.

General information

The parish of Graven (later spelled "Granvin") was established as a municipality on 1 January 1838 (see formannskapsdistrikt law). This new municipality was very large and it included two annexes to the parish: Ulvik and Eidfjord. On 1 January 1859, "Ulvik" became the main parish, so that Granvin and Eidfjord became annexes to Ulvik, and the name of municipality was changed accordingly.

On 1 May 1891, the western annex of Granvin (population: 1,331) and the southeastern annex of Eidfjord (population: 1,018) were both separated from Ulvik to become separate municipalities. On 1 January 1964, the Lussand-Kvanndal area of Kinsarvik municipality (population: 72) were transferred to Granvin.

On 1 January 2020, the neighboring municipalities of Granvin and Voss were merged into a new large municipality called Voss.

Name
The municipality (originally the parish) is named after the old "Granvin" farm, since the first Granvin Church was built there. The first element is grǫn which means "spruce" and the last element is vin which means "meadow" or "pasture". Granvin is one of few parishes in Western Norway with spruce forests.

The name of the parish was spelled as "Graven" before 1858. It was then spelled as "Granvin" from 1858 until 1891. Then the old spelling of "Graven" was used again briefly from 1892 to 1898. Since 1898 the spelling of "Granvin" has been used.

Coat of arms
The coat of arms was granted on 13 May 1988. The arms show a hardanger-fiddle (Hardingfele), which is a Norwegian folk instrument. Granvin is situated in the Hardanger region, and has an active folk-music tradition.

Churches
The Church of Norway had one parish within the municipality of Granvin. It is part of the Hardanger og Voss prosti (deanery) in the Diocese of Bjørgvin.

Geography

The municipality was situated along both sides of the Granvin Fjord (a small arm off of the main Hardangerfjorden) and the valley extending inland from the end of the fjord, in the region of Hardanger. The large lake Granvinsvatnet lies right in the center of the valley, just north of the village of Eide. On both sides of the fjord and valley, there are high mountains. Espeland Falls is located in the Espelandsdalen valley near the border with Ulvik. The Skjervefossen waterfall is also located in Granvin.

Transportation
Norwegian National Road 13 enters Granvin via the Tunsberg Tunnel which runs through the high mountains to the northwest. The highway then runs through Granvin before entering the Vallavik Tunnel which runs through the high mountains to the southeast. The Vallavik Tunnel connects up with the Hardanger Bridge in Ulvik which crosses the Hardangerfjorden. A car ferry service connects Kvanndal (in southwest Granvin) with the villages of Utne and Kinsarvik (in Ullensvang municipality) on the south side of the Hardangerfjord. From 1935 to 1988, Hardanger railway line ran between Granvin and Vossevangen. The line was closed in 1988 and the rails were later removed.

History
{{Historical populations
|footnote = Source: Statistics Norway.
|shading = off
|1951|1158
|1960|1102
|1970|1039
|1980|996
|1990|1036
|2000|1044
|2010|947
|2017|933
}}

In April 1940, during the German invasion of Norway during World War II, there was some fighting between German and Norwegian forces in Granvin. German forces landed in the village of Granvin on 25 April as part of their pincer movement towards the Norwegian military camps at Vossevangen. There was fighting at Skjervefossen for most of that day, until the Norwegian forces retreated late at night to avoid encirclement. Four Norwegian soldiers and at least 30 German soldiers fell in the fighting.

The population of Granvin had been dropping in recent years. In 1951, the population was 1,158. Since then, it has dropped by 21.3% to 911 in 2014. This situation is common in many smaller, rural municipalities in Norway.

Government

The municipal council  of Granvin was made up of 13 representatives that are elected to four year terms. The party breakdown of the council is as follows:

Notable residents
Lars Jonson Haukaness (1863-1929), an impressionist painter
Hans Dahl (1849-1937), an artist specializing in landscape paintings
Olav Medaas (1926-2019), 3 times champion in Norwegian national shooting competition, also a military worldchampion.

In popular culture
Granvin is a major setting in Moe Cidaly's short story "Summer Episode''".

See also
List of former municipalities of Norway

References

External links

Municipal fact sheet from Statistics Norway 

 
Voss
Former municipalities of Norway
1838 establishments in Norway
2020 disestablishments in Norway